Keith Poole (24 April 1927 – 15 September 2012) was an Australian international lawn bowler.

Bowls career

World Championships
Poole won a silver medal in the fours with Don Woolnough, Leigh Bishop and Barry Salter and a bronze medal in the team event (Leonard Cup) at the 1976 World Outdoor Bowls Championship in Johannesburg. He also won a silver medal in the team event four years later.

Commonwealth Games
Poole won a silver medal as part of the fours team with Robert King, Errol Bungey and Errol Stewart at the 1974 British Commonwealth Games in Christchurch, New Zealand.  Eight years later he skipped the four to a gold medal success in the 1982 Commonwealth Games in Brisbane. The gold medal winning team was Poole, Rob Dobbins, Bert Sharp and Don Sherman.

Asia Pacific Championships
He won a gold medal at the Asia Pacific Bowls Championships in the 1985 fours at Tweed Heads, New South Wales.

Personal life
He was an accountant by trade and was inducted into the Australian Hall of Fame. He died in 2012.

References

Australian male bowls players
Australian accountants
1927 births
2012 deaths
Commonwealth Games medallists in lawn bowls
Commonwealth Games gold medallists for Australia
Bowls players at the 1974 British Commonwealth Games
Bowls players at the 1982 Commonwealth Games
Medallists at the 1974 British Commonwealth Games
Medallists at the 1982 Commonwealth Games